

About SchoolArts Magazine 
SchoolArts is a magazine written by and for K–12 art educators. It is produced by Davis Publications, a family-owned publisher of pre-K–12 art curriculum. The publisher and president, Julian Davis Wade, is a fifth-generation member of the Davis family, who has published the magazine continuously since its origin in 1901. Julian is the great-great-grandson of Gilbert G. Davis, the founder of the magazine, along with three prominent art educators from Massachusetts in the early 1900s.

History
SchoolArts magazine originated in 1901 in Worcester, Massachusetts when Henry Turner Bailey (state agent for the Promotion of Industrial Drawing), Fred Daniels (supervisor of drawing in the city of Worcester), James Hall (supervised drawing in Springfield), and Gilbert Gates Davis (a printer) collaborated to produce The Applied Arts Book, now known as SchoolArts. They believed art teachers needed a periodical to help them develop and use emerging art curricula. They were determined “to promote by every legitimate means the progress of sound art instruction and the development of public taste in all matters relating to the applied arts.  

SchoolArts articles have been used for movements such as Picture Study, the Arts and Crafts movement, and multiculturalism. Contributing writers have included Arthur Wesley Dow, Viktor Lowenfeld and John Dewey. As SchoolArts grew, the publication moved to developing books. In 1958, Davis Publications was incorporated as a separate company that continued to publish SchoolArts.

Currently
Today SchoolArts publishes ten issues a year and is available in both print and digital formats. It has a print circulation of 7,000 and 30,000 digital subscribers.

SchoolArts is located in the Printer’s Building, built by the Davis family in 1923. The current editor (2005-present), Nancy Walkup, is a retired art educator who has taught art to students from K–12 to college for over 30 years. In addition to her work as Editor, Nancy writes the popular SchoolArts Room blog and is a contributing author for Explorations in Art, Davis’ elementary textbook series. Outside of her work with Davis, she is the Director of the North Texas Institute for Educators on the Visual Arts at the University of North Texas and the NAEA Elementary Director.

SchoolArts works cooperatively with the National Art Education Association to promote the value of education of the visual arts.

Content 
SchoolArts magazine issues run throughout the year beginning with an August issue to begin the traditional school year and a Summer issue to end it. 

Every thematic issue offers studio lessons for early childhood, elementary, middle, and high school. Articles are submitted by art educators and focus on trends in art education, art advocacy, and classroom resources. In addition to lessons and articles the magazine produces features focusing on art history, contemporary artists, careers in art, and support for teachers in addressing the needs of all learners, including students with special needs and English language learners.

References

External links
 SchoolArts Magazine website
 . v.1-19 (1901-1920) fulltext
Davis Publications website

Visual arts magazines published in the United States
Education magazines
Magazines established in 1901
Magazines published in Massachusetts
Nine times annually magazines
Art education organizations